Brownea enricii is a tree in the family Fabaceae, native to Colombia. It is named for the Colombian botanist Enrique Forero.

Description
Inflorescences are densely flowered with flowers featuring five red petals.

Distribution and habitat
Brownea enricii is endemic to Colombia, where it is found in Boyacá, Cundinamarca,
Casanare, Caquetá, Meta and Putumayo Departments.

References

enricii
Endemic flora of Colombia
Plants described in 1995